Fritz Friedrichs is the name of:

Fritz Friedrichs (painter) (1882–1928), German painter
Fritz Walter Paul Friedrichs (1882–1958), German chemist